The 40th Academy of Country Music Awards were held on May 17, 2005 at the Mandalay Bay Resort & Casino, Las Vegas, Nevada.

Winners and nominees 
Winners are shown in bold.

References 

Academy of Country Music Awards
Academy of Country Music Awards
Academy of Country Music Awards
Academy of Country Music Awards
Academy of Country Music Awards
Academy of Country Music Awards